Illuminate may refer to:

Music

Bands
 Illuminate (2009), a 2009 E.P. by English Progressive Metal band Suns of the Tundra
 Illuminate (band), a German gothic music band

Albums and EPs

 Illuminate (Joe Morris and Rob Brown album), 1995
 Illuminate (David Crowder Band album), 2003
 Illuminate, an EP by Qntal, 2004
 Illuminate (Karmacoda album), 2007 album by Karmacoda
 Illuminate (Lydia album), 2008
 Illuminate (Destine album), 2012
 Illuminate... (The Hits and More), 2013 album by 911
 Illuminate (Shawn Mendes album), 2016

See also
 Illuminate Light & Laser Spectacular, a show at the Dreamworld theme park on the Gold Coast, Australia
 Illuminated (disambiguation)
 Illuminates of Thanateros, a magic society, founded in 1987
 Illuminati (disambiguation)
 Illumination (disambiguation)
 Illuminations (disambiguation)
 Illuminator (disambiguation)
 Team Illuminate (disambiguation)